Temple Beth Israel (TBI) is a synagogue affiliated with Progressive Judaism in Melbourne, Australia. The organisation is a member of the Union for Progressive Judaism, an umbrella organisation for Progressive Judaism in Asia and the Pacific.

The synagogue was founded in 1930, and was the first Progressive community in Australia.

The Progressive, Zionist youth group, Netzer makes use of the grounds of TBI for their weekly activities.

During the COVID-19 pandemic TBI moved their prayers online for the High Holy Days, when Melbourne was in  the middle of a strict stage 4 lockdown.

See also

 List of synagogues in Australia and New Zealand
 History of the Jews in Australia

References 

Synagogues in Melbourne
Synagogues completed in 1930
Jews and Judaism in Australia
St Kilda, Victoria
Buildings and structures in the City of Port Phillip
Reform Judaism in Australia
Union for Progressive Judaism